Trump Village is a seven-building apartment complex in Coney Island, Brooklyn, New York City, U.S.

History
The apartment complex was built in 1963–1964 by Fred Trump, the father of Donald Trump. The complex, built on the site of the former Culver Depot, was designed by architect Morris Lapidus.

The construction cost US$70 million. It was supported by the New York State Housing Finance Agency through public bonds issued by the state of New York, coupled with tax exemption. Five out of the seven buildings were part of the Mitchell-Lama Housing Program until 2007.

It is the only Trump building complex named for Fred Trump rather than his son Donald.

References

External links

Condominiums and housing cooperatives in Brooklyn
Morris Lapidus buildings
Residential buildings completed in 1964
Donald Trump
1964 establishments in New York City
Coney Island